was a Japanese diplomat and served as first Japanese Ambassador to the People's Republic of China as diplomatic relations between them were established in 1972.

Career 
Ogawa entered the Ministry of Foreign Affairs in 1939, and was immediately stationed to Beijing as a researcher. In 1940, Ogawa audited at the Fu Jen Catholic University after one year of Chinese language studying.

In 1968, Ogawa was appointed the sixth ambassador of Japan to Denmark. In March 1973, Ogawa was appointed the first ambassador of Japan to the People's Republic of China.

Family 

Heishiro Ogawa was the fourth son of Heikichi Ogawa, who served as the Minister of Justice and the Minister of Railways of Japan in the 1920s.

References

External links
 Obituary on Ogawa in the Baltimore Sun

1916 births
1997 deaths
Ambassadors of Japan to China
Ambassadors of Japan to Denmark
Catholic University of Peking alumni
University of Tokyo alumni
Consuls General of Japan in Hong Kong